Megacraspedus lagopellus is a moth of the family Gelechiidae. It is found in Russia (Lower Volga, southern Ural) and Hungary.

References

Moths described in 1860
Megacraspedus
Moths of Europe